This list of botanical gardens and arboretums in Utah is intended to include all significant botanical gardens and arboretums in the US state of Utah

See also
List of botanical gardens and arboretums in the United States

References 

 
Arboreta in Utah
botanical gardens and arboretums in Utah